Michael Palmer Brackenbury (6 July 1930 – 4 February 2022) was an English Anglican priest who served as Archdeacon of Lincoln from 1988 to 1995. 
 
Brackenbury was born on 6 July 1930. He was educated at Norwich School and  Lincoln Theological College. He was a curate in South Ormsby from   1966 to 1969. After this he was Rector  of Sudbrooke from  1969 to 1977; then Diocesan Director  of ordinands from  1977 to 1987. From 1979 until 1995 he was a Canon and Prebendary of Lincoln Cathedral.

Brackenbury died on 4 February 2022, at the age of 91.

References

1930 births
2022 deaths
Alumni of Lincoln Theological College
Archdeacons of Lincoln
People educated at Norwich School